W Architecture & Landscape Architecture (W Architecture) is an international architecture and landscape architecture firm based in Brooklyn, New York City. Founded in 1999 by Barbara E. Wilks, the firm is primarily known for its design of major waterfront reclamation projects and collaborative repurposing of public spaces. W Architecture has received substantial coverage in the media for the Edge Park in Williamsburg, Brooklyn; a redesign of the West Harlem waterfront; restoration of St. Patrick's Island in Calgary; and the recent Plaza 33 Madison Square Garden adjacency.

History 
W Architecture & Landscape Architecture was formed as a Limited Liability Corporation in 1999 by Barbara E. Wilks, who remains founder and principal of the firm. Wilks, a fellow in both the American Institute of Architects (FAIA) and the American Society of Landscape Architects (FASLA), claims to have started the company "to create a design-oriented, multidisciplinary practice focused on urban issues," and to "realign nature and the city. In recent years, W Architecture's projects have increasingly moved toward larger collaborations spanning multiple municipal agencies such as NYCEDC and other neighborhood revitalization organizations or economic development councils.

Philosophy 

In the 2015 Now Urbanism: The Future City is Here W Architecture is described as being part of a "new kind of urban activism and urban design," willing to "stimulate social action for sustainable urban design and therefore cooler cities." The firm's site plans display a preference for the reintroduction of natural ecological systems rather than ad hoc botanical features. The designs tend to emphasize the resiliency of local flora previously displaced by manmade, commercial manipulation of municipal waterways. Consistent characteristics throughout the firm's portfolio are the utilization of reclaimed local materials, streets and walks that turn into greenways, sloped planes, as well as long angular overlays and subtle dimensional transitioning to introduce water, botanical, and recreational features. Not all the firm's projects are waterfront revitalizations, however, Wilks said, speaking at the 2013 reSITE conference in Prague, she enjoys this kind of work because it's "where natural systems come together with manmade, human systems."

Wilks has also integrated a research component into the firm's projects regarding the advantages of bringing back wetland areas to the New York City coastline. She has advocated for the reintroduction of these areas as a means to buffer storm surge, especially after damages caused by Hurricane Sandy, and to increase access to waterfront areas for people and animals.

Notable Projects

The Edge Park in Williamsburg 
New zoning laws passed in accordance with Bloomberg's claiming of the river as "the sixth borough" opened the way for multiple waterfront parks in New York City, such as The Edge Park in Williamsburg, Brooklyn. Anticipating an increase in density and need for waterfront access, the park was deemed a mixed-use site along the East River and completed in March 2011. According to Wilks, the park allows "the city grid and the river's ecosystem to converge, mingle, and clash..." To this end, W Architecture utilized several of its signature elements, including: a street that becomes a pedestrian greenway; deep pier structures that make the area seem more like land than traditional piers; a garage area covered by a sloping lawn; and stone that allows for rising and falling waterlines.

St. Patrick's Island 
A restoration of the previously existing island park in the Bow River between the East Village and Bridgeland, in Calgary, Alberta, St. Patrick's Island was a collaborative project by W Architecture and Denver-based Civitas. Though already established as a park in the late 19th century, the island had been degrading and was seen by the city as an underused area that had fallen into disrepair. In 2010 Calgary Municipal Land Corporation began an effort to re-establish the park to its current usable area of 31 hectares. Completed in July 2015, the park now features a number of elements that have both made it more usable to the public and have restored its channels and biodiversity. Features include: a "seasonal breach" for wading onto a gravel bar; a sloped grassy knoll which serves as s viewing area for movies, performances, and sledding in the winter; a riparian wetland with a boardwalk across it; an amphitheater and water features; and a 23-meter sculpture entitled "Bloom."

West Harlem Piers Park 

As a major early component of a larger waterfront master plan undertaken for West Harlem, West Harlem Piers Park was completed in the Fall of 2008. The result of efforts by 40 neighborhood groups and coalitions, the park linked the coastline between Riverside Park and Riverbank State Park. As master planners for the project, W Architecture converted a narrow strip of land, essentially a 69,000 sq. ft. parking lot that cut off the community of West Harlem from the waterfront, into a 105,526 sq. ft. park. It features granite benches, sloped lawn areas, repurposed cobblestone in paved areas, and various water access features for kayaking, fishing, and general recreation. As a result of the design, a substantial increase in land permeability was achieved and accommodations for fluctuating runoff and storm surges have allowed the park to sustain dramatic weather events since its completion.

Portfolio 
 Tide Point
 Plaza 33
 St. Petersburg Pier Approach
 The Bentalou Library
 Troy Riverfront Park
 Cornell University College of Human Ecology
 Doma Gallery
 King Abdullah Financial District
 Sheikh Rashid Bin Saeed Crossing
 Tyson's Corner Master Plan
 USS Constellation
 Villahermosa

Awards

St. Patrick’s Island 

 2016 National Urban Design Awards; St. Patrick’s Island 
 Urban Design Catalyst Calgary 2016; Mayor’s Award; St. Patrick’s Island
 Canadian Society of Landscape Architects 2015; Regional Merit Award; St. Patrick’s Island
 ASLA Denver 2015 Honor Award; St. Patrick’s Island
 AIA NY 2014 Design Award; St. Patrick’s Island

West Harlem Piers Park 

 AIA 2005 National Honor Award for Regional and Urban Design
 Beverly Willis Foundation 2015 Built by Women NYC Award; West Harlem Piers Park 
 MASterworks Awards 2010; Neighborhood Catalyst, West Harlem Piers Park
 ASLA NY 2009 Honor Award; West Harlem Piers Park
 The Waterfront Center 2009; Honor Award; West Harlem Piers Park

The Edge Park 

 ASLA NY 2012 Merit Award; The Edge Park

Plaza 33 

 ASLA-NY 2016 Design Awards; Plaza 33 
 AIA NY 2016 Design Award; Plaza 33 
 AIA NYS 2016 Honor Award
 ASLA NY 2016 Honor Award

DoMa Gallery

 AIA 2004 National Honor Award
 AIA NYS 2003 Award of Excellence

Cornell University, Human Ecology Building 

 AIA NY 2012 Merit Award; Cornell University, Human Ecology Building

Tide Point

 ASLA 2003 National Design Merit Award

Sources

Wilks, Barbara, Eric Sanderson, and Michael Sorkin (2013). Structuring Confluence: The Work of W Architecture & Landscape Architecture. ORO Editions.

References

External links 
Official Website
reSITE 2013 Interview with Barbara Wilks
Barbara Wilks and Johannes Feder On West Harlem Piers at The Architectural League
"Reclaiming Waterfronts" Lecture

Landscape architecture